Nanchang railway station is a railway station located in the city of Nanchang, in Jiangxi province, eastern China.

It serves the Changjiu Intercity Railway, Nanchang–Jiujiang Intercity Railway, and Jingjiu railway.

The station opened in 1935.

Adjacent Stations
Next (west/north): Nanchang Railway Station Second Spot (Nanchang West)
Next (south): Qingyunpu railway station (Nanchang South)

See also
Nanchang Rail Transit

References

Railway stations in Jiangxi
Railway stations in China opened in 1935
Transport in Nanchang
Stations on the Beijing–Kowloon Railway
Buildings and structures in Nanchang